The Dallas Mavericks are an American professional basketball team based in Dallas, Texas. They are members of the Southwest Division of the Western Conference in the National Basketball Association (NBA). The Mavericks began playing in the NBA as an expansion team in the 1980–81 season. In their inaugural season, they posted a win–loss record of 15–67.

From 1983 to 1990, the Mavericks, led by key players including Mark Aguirre, Brad Davis and Rolando Blackman, made the postseason six out of seven times, appearing in the Conference Finals in 1988. For the rest of the decade the Mavericks were dreadful: they bottomed out with an 11—71 record and the worst average point differential in NBA history during the 1992–93 season. This was followed by a 13–69 mark in the 1993–94 season – easily the worst two-season record in NBA history – and the Mavericks did not win more than thirty-six games in any season until 1999–2000.

The Mavericks returned to prominence in the 2000s, coinciding with the franchise's purchase by Mark Cuban. Leading by the trio of Dirk Nowitzki, Michael Finley and Steve Nash, they returned to the playoffs in 2001 and to the Conference Finals in 2003. While Nash and Finley left in 2004 and 2005 respectively, Nowitzki emerged as the team’s leader, leading the Mavericks to their first NBA Finals appearance in 2006, only to lose to the Miami Heat. After a series of early exits from the playoffs, the Mavericks returned to the NBA Finals again in 2011, also against the Heat, and won their first NBA Championship.

The Mavericks have played 40 seasons, and advanced to the playoffs in 22 of those seasons. They have won three division titles, have been conference champions two times and have won one NBA Championship.

Table key

Seasons

All-time records

Notes

References
General

Specific

 
seasons